Tres Algarrobos is a town in Buenos Aires Province, Argentina. It is located in the Carlos Tejedor Partido.

History
The area was inhabited by native Argentines until the late 19th Century. In the 1880s the frontier was expanded to include the local territory. The settlement was created around 1900 when 16,000 hectares of land was divided into 100 hectare plots by the Ministry of Public Works. The settlement was officially founded on 17 August 1901.

The first train passed through Tres Algarrobos in 1910 when the Ferrocarril Oeste was opened.

External links

 Municipal website
 El Algarrobense Digital newspaper

Populated places in Buenos Aires Province
Populated places established in 1901